Hedong Subdistrict is a subdistrict of the city of Botou, Hebei, People's Republic of China. , it has 18 residential communities under its administration.

See also
List of township-level divisions of Hebei

References

Township-level divisions of Hebei
Botou